UNIT: The Coup is a Big Finish Productions audio drama based on the long-running British science fiction television series Doctor Who. It stars Nicholas Courtney reprising his role as Brigadier Lethbridge-Stewart, the former commander of UNIT (United Nations Intelligence Taskforce). The Coup was given away free with Doctor Who Magazine #351 as a prologue to a four-part mini-series. The Coup occupies the first thirteen tracks on the CD, the fourteenth to twenty-first being occupied by Silver Lining, and the twenty-second to thirty-third occupied by promotions for various Big Finish Productions Doctor Who and Bernice Summerfield audio plays.

From September 2008, Big Finish re-released the play as a free download.

Plot 
As London faces the return of the Silurians, the UK branch of UNIT is preparing to shut down.

Cast
Colonel Emily Chaudhry - Siri O'Neal
The Brigadier - Nicholas Courtney
Silurian Ambassador - Matthew Brenher
Captain Andrea Winnington - Sara Carver
Sergeant French - Mark Wright
Corporal Ledger - Joseph Lidster
Scott Cartwright - Scott Andrews
Francis Currie - Michael Hobbs

Continuity
 UNIT previously dealt with the Silurians in the TV story The Silurians.
 This is the first story to state that the Brigadier has been knighted. This is later seen to be the case in the new TV series episode "The Poison Sky" and the Sarah Jane Adventures story Enemy of the Bane.

References

Coup
2004 audio plays